The Women's 800 metre freestyle competition of the 2022 FINA World Swimming Championships (25 m) will be held on 14 December 2022.

Records
Prior to the competition, the existing world and championship records were as follows.

Results
The slowest heats were held at 11:19, and the fastest heat at 19:42.

References

Women's 800 metre freestyle
2022 in women's swimming